Treatment may refer to:
 "Treatment" (song), a 2012 song by 
 Film treatment, a prose telling of a story intended to be turned into a screenplay
 Medical treatment or therapy
 Sewage treatment
 Surface treatment or surface finishing
 Water treatment

See also 

 In Treatment, an American drama television series
 In Treatment (Italian TV series), an Italian drama television series
 National treatment, an economic concept focused on grantings to foreigners of rights similar to those of domestic nationals
 Silent treatment, a form of social rejection
 The Treatment (disambiguation)
 Treatment group, the collection of items or individuals receiving the same treatment in an experiment
 Window treatment, any of various styling choices specific to the interiors of windows